is a Japanese rugby union player who plays as a Flanker.

References

1987 births
Living people
Japanese rugby union players
Rugby union flankers
Tokyo Sungoliath players
Japan international rugby union players
Sunwolves players